The 2014 FIVB Volleyball Women's World Championship featured 24 teams. One place was allocated to the hosts, Italy, but no automatic place is given to the defending champions, Russia. The remaining 23 places were determined by a qualification process, in which entrants from among the other teams from the five FIVB confederations will compete.

Qualified teams
{| class="wikitable sortable" style="text-align: left;"
|-
! rowspan=2 style="width:150px;"|Country
! rowspan=2 style="width:100px;"|Confederation
! rowspan=2 style="width:260px;"|Qualified as
! rowspan=2 style="width:110px;"|Qualified on
! colspan=3 |Previous appearances
|-
! Total*
! First
! Last
|-
|  || CEV ||  || 0125 November 2009 ||align=center|  ||align=center| 1978 ||align=center| 2010
|-
|  || AVC ||  || 027 September 2013 ||align=center|  ||align=center| 1998 ||align=center| 2010
|-
|  || AVC ||  || 037 September 2013 ||align=center|  ||align=center| 1960 ||align=center| 2010
|-
|  || CEV ||  || 0413 September 2013 ||align=center|  ||align=center| 1952 ||align=center| 2010
|-
|  || CEV ||  || 0513 September 2013 ||align=center|  ||align=center| 1956 ||align=center| 2010
|-
|  || CSV ||  || 0621 September 2013 ||align=center|  ||align=center| 1956 ||align=center| 2010
|-
|  || AVC ||  || 0730 September 2013 ||align=center|  ||align=center| 1956 ||align=center| 2010
|-
|  || AVC ||  || 081 October 2013 ||align=center|  ||align=center| 2006 ||align=center| 2010
|-
|  || CSV ||  || 0920 October 2013 ||align=center|  ||align=center| 1960 ||align=center| 2002
|-
|  || CEV ||  || 105 January 2014 ||align=center|  ||align=center| 2006 ||align=center| 2010
|-
|  || CEV ||  || 115 January 2014 ||align=center|  ||align=center| 1952 ||align=center| 2002
|-
|  || CEV ||  || 125 January 2014 ||align=center|  ||align=center| 1994 ||align=center| 2006
|-
|  || CEV ||  || 135 January 2014 ||align=center|  ||align=center| 1956 ||align=center| 1978
|-
|  || CEV ||  || 145 January 2014 ||align=center|  ||align=center| 1998 ||align=center| 2010
|-
|  || CEV ||  || 155 January 2014 ||align=center|  ||align=center| 1978 ||align=center| 2010
|-
|  || CEV ||  || 165 January 2014 ||align=center|  ||align=center| 1956 ||align=center| 2010
|-
|  || CAVB ||  || 1722 February 2014 ||align=center|  ||align=center| 1978 ||align=center| 1986
|-
|  || CAVB ||  || 181 March 2014 ||align=center|  ||align=center| 2006 ||align=center| 2006
|-
|  || NORCECA ||  || 1917 May 2014 ||align=center|  ||align=center| 1970 ||align=center| 2010
|-
|  || NORCECA ||  || 2018 May 2014 ||align=center|  ||align=center| 1956 ||align=center| 2010
|-
|  || NORCECA ||  || 2118 May 2014 ||align=center|  ||align=center| 1974 ||align=center| 2010
|-
|  || NORCECA ||  || 2219 May 2014 ||align=center|  ||align=center| 1974 ||align=center| 2010
|-
|  || NORCECA ||  || 2325 May 2014 ||align=center|  ||align=center| 1974 ||align=center| 2010
|-
|  || NORCECA ||  || 2420 July 2014 ||align=center|  ||align=center| 1970 ||align=center| 2006
|}
* Total (including 2014 edition).
1.Competed as Soviet Union from 1952 to 1990; 6th appearance as Russia.
2.Competed as West Germany from 1956 to 1990; 6th appearance as Germany.
3.Competed as Yugoslavia for 1978 and Serbia and Montenegro for 2006; 2nd appearance as Serbia.

Confederation qualification processes

The distribution by confederation for the 2014 FIVB Volleyball Women's World Championship will be:

 Asia and Oceania (AVC): 4 places
 Africa (CAVB): 2 places
 Europe (CEV): 9 places (+ Italy qualified automatically as host nation for a total of 10 places)
 South America (CSV): 2 places
 North, Central America and Caribbean (NORCECA): 6 places

AVC

  (Final Round)
  (Final Round)
  (Zonal Round, Final Round)
  (Zonal Round)
  (Zonal Round, Final Round)
  (Zonal Round)
  (Final Round)
  (Final Round)
  (Zonal Round)
  (Final Round)
  (Zonal Round)
  (Final Round)
  (Final Round)
  (Zonal Round)
  (Zonal Round, Final Round)

CAVB

  (Sub Zonal Round, Final Round)
  (Sub Zonal Round, Zonal Round, Final Round)
  (Sub Zonal Round)
  (Sub Zonal Round)
  (Sub Zonal Round, Zonal Round, Final Round)
  (Sub Zonal Round, Zonal Round, Withdrew)
  (Sub Zonal Round, Zonal Round)
  (Sub Zonal Round, Zonal Round, Final Round)
  (Sub Zonal Round, Zonal Round, Final Round)
  (Sub Zonal Round)
  (Sub Zonal Round, Zonal Round)
  (Sub Zonal Round, Zonal Round, Withdrew)
  (Sub Zonal Round, Withdrew)
  (Sub Zonal Round, Zonal Round)
  (Sub Zonal Round, Zonal Round, Final Round)
  (Sub Zonal Round)
  (Sub Zonal Round)
  (Sub Zonal Round, Zonal Round)
  (Sub Zonal Round, Zonal Round, Final Round)
  (Sub Zonal Round, Zonal Round)
  (Sub Zonal Round)
  (Sub Zonal Round, Zonal Round, Final Round)
  (Sub Zonal Round, Zonal Round, Final Round)
  (Sub Zonal Round, Zonal Round, Final Round)
  (Sub Zonal Round)
  (Sub Zonal Round, Zonal Round)
  (Sub Zonal Round, Zonal Round)
  (Sub Zonal Round, Zonal Round)
  (Sub Zonal Round, Final Round)
  (Sub Zonal Round, Zonal Round, Final Round)
  (Sub Zonal Round, Zonal Round)
  (Sub Zonal Round, Zonal Round)

CEV

  (First Round)
  (CEV Championship) (First Round)
  (CEV Championship) (Third Round)
  (CEV Championship) (First Round, Third Round)
  (CEV Championship) (First Round, Third Round)
  (First Round)
  (CEV Championship) (Third Round)
  (CEV Championship) (First Round, Third Round)
  (CEV Championship) (First Round, Third Round)
  (CEV Championship) (Third Round)
  (CEV Championship) (First Round)
  (First Round, Third Round)
  (CEV Championship) (First Round)
  (CEV Championship) (Third Round)
  (CEV Championship)
  (CEV Championship)
  (CEV Championship) (First Round, Second Round)
  (CEV Championship) (First Round, Second Round, Third Round)
  (First Round)
  (CEV Championship) (First Round, Second Round, Third Round)
  (CEV Championship) (First Round, Second Round)
  (First Round)
  (First Round)
  (First Round)
  (First Round)
  (First Round)
  (First Round)
  (CEV Championship) (First Round, Second Round)
  (CEV Championship) (Third Round)
  (First Round)
  (CEV Championship) (Third Round)
  (CEV Championship) (First Round)
  (CEV Championship) (Third Round)
  (CEV Championship)
  (First Round)
  (First Round)
  (CEV Championship) (Third Round)
  (CEV Championship) (First Round, Third Round)
  (CEV Championship)
  (CEV Championship) (Third Round)
  (CEV Championship)
  (CEV Championship) (First Round, Second Round, Third Round)
  (CEV Championship) (Third Round)
  (CEV Championship) (First Round, Third Round)

CSV

  (CSV Championship) (Qualification Tournament)
  (CSV Championship)
  (CSV Championship)
  (CSV Championship) (Qualification Tournament)
  (CSV Championship) (Qualification Tournament)
  (CSV Championship)

NORCECA

  (First Round, Second Round)
  (First Round, Second Round)
  (First Round, Second Round)
  (First Round)
  (First Round, Second Round, Third Round)
  (First Round, Second Round)
  (First Round, Second Round)
  (First Round)
  (First Round, Second Round)
  (Third Round)
  (First Round)
  (Third Round, Playoff round)
  (Third Round)
  (First Round, Second Round, Third Round)
  (First Round, Second Round)
  (Third Round)
  (First Round, Second Round, Third Round)
  (First Round, Second Round)
  (First Round, Second Round, Third Round)
  (First Round, Second Round, Third Round)
  (First Round, Second Round, Third Round)
  (First Round, Second Round, Third Round)
  (First Round, Second Round, Third Round)
  (First Round)
  (Third Round, Playoff round)
  (First Round, Second Round, Third Round, Playoff round)
  (First Round, Second Round, Third Round, Playoff round)
  (Third Round)
  (First Round, Second Round)
  (First Round, Second Round, Third Round)
  (First Round)
  (First Round, Second Round)
  (First Round)
  (First Round)
  (First Round, Second Round)
  (First Round, Second Round, Third Round, Playoff round)
  (First Round, Second Round, Third Round)
  (Third Round)

References

External links

 2014 World Championship Qualification NORCECA

2014 FIVB Volleyball Women's World Championship
FIVB Volleyball World Championship qualification